is the 26th single by Japanese duo Pink Lady, released on December 13, 2019. It was Pink Lady's first new single in over 15 years.

Background 
During a press conference at Yomiuri Hall on December 1, 2019, Level-5 founder Akihiro Hino explained that Pink Lady were chosen by Nayutalien to record the song, as the composition was based on songs from the 1970s and 1980s. Hino initially dismissed Nayutalien's proposal as a joke, but he approached the duo as a favor and was surprised that they accepted the offer.

Upon receiving Nayutalien's demo of the song, Mie pointed that it had brass and string arrangements reminiscent of songs composed by longtime Pink Lady songwriter Shunichi Tokura. Keiko Masuda was also impressed with the arrangement, but initially found it difficult to sing due to its wide range and sarcastically stated that "Meteor" may be Pink Lady's final recording. The duo also added some Easter eggs in the film: Moco-chan, a storybook character created by Mie, makes a cameo appearance while Masuda does a voice cameo.

Music video 
The official music video was uploaded on Level-5's YouTube channel on December 13, 2019. It features , a character based on Nayutalien.

Track listing 
All tracks are written and arranged by Nayutalien.

References

2019 singles
2019 songs
Pink Lady (band) songs
Japanese-language songs
Anime songs
Yo-kai Watch